The Arrival of Joachim Stiller  (Dutch: De Komst van Joachim Stiller) is a 1976 Belgian film directed by Harry Kümel based on the book of the same name. It originally aired as three 50-minute episodes in Flanders. The Dutch broadcast it as one part, cutting out 45 minutes. Harry Kümel made a cinematic version of 110 minutes. The Flemish DVD release edits the three original TV episodes into one film with a runtime of 153 minutes at the request of the director, and includes Dutch, French and English subtitles.

Cast

External links 
 

Belgian drama films
1976 films
1970s Dutch-language films
Films directed by Harry Kümel
Films shot in Antwerp
Films shot in Belgium
Films based on Belgian novels
1976 drama films